Angeline Boulley is a Chippewa (Ojibwe) author and has worked to improve education for Indigenous children. Her debut work, Firekeeper's Daughter, was named one of the top 100 young adult novels of all time by Time magazine, was a New York Times best seller, and will be adapted into a miniseries by Higher Ground.

Personal life 
Boulley is an enrolled member of the Sault Ste. Marie Tribe of Chippewa Indians. She was born and raised in "Bahweting (the place of the rapids) in Sault Ste. Marie, Michigan."

She is a graduate of Central Michigan University.

Her "father is a traditional firekeeper, who strikes ceremonial fires at spiritual activities in the tribal community and ensures protocols are followed, while providing cultural teachings through stories told around the fire."

Career 
Boulley has worked in "Indian education at the tribal, state, and national levels." At the tribal level, she served as the Educational Director and Assistant Director. She also served on the  Board of Regents at Bay Mills Community College before becoming the Director for the Office of Indian Education at the U.S. Department of Education.

At present, Boulley works as a full-time author.

Firekeeper's Daughter 

Boulley's debut novel, Firekeeper's Daughter, was published March 16, 2021 by Henry Holt and Co. The book is a New York Times best seller. Time magazine named it one of the best 100 young adult books of all time. In 2022, it won the Michael L. Printz Award for young adult literature and the William C. Morris Award, as well as the American Indian Youth Literature Award Best Young Adult Honor. In the same year, it was named to the Bank Street Children's Book Committee's Best Books of the Year List with an "Outstanding Merit" distinction and shared the Committee's 2022 Josette Frank Award with Matt de la Peña and Christian Robinson's Milo Imagines the World. It is being adapted for television at Netflix by Higher Ground Productions, former President Barack Obama and Michelle Obama's production company.

References 

Living people
Ojibwe people
American young adult novelists
Michael L. Printz Award winners
21st-century American women writers
1966 births
The William C. Morris YA Debut Award winners